Brigadier General Krupert Eric Nel  is a retired South African Army officer.

Military career 
Brig Gen Nel joined the South African Defence Force at the School of Engineers in 1978 as a National Serviceman, where he later became
an officer. In 1980 he completed the Special Forces Basic Training and was transferred to 4 Special Forces Regiment in Langebaan. In May 1985 he participated in the ill-fated incursion into Cabinda - Operation Argon - that resulted in two Special Forces operators being killed in action and a third being captured by MPLA forces.

From 1994 to 1998 he was the Officer Commanding of 4 Special Forces Regiment and then served as the Chief of Staff of the South African Special Forces Brigade, becoming the General Officer Commanding in 2003.

In 2006 he was appointed as the Chief of Staff of the South African Army Infantry Formation.

Brig Nel retired in March 2012.

Awards and decorations

Medals 
Gen Nel has been awarded the following medals:

Proficiency and Qualification badges 
Gen Nel qualified for the following:

References

South African Army generals
Living people
Year of birth missing (living people)